Jacques-Charles Renaud Dubuisson (1666–1739) was born in France and came to Canada in 1685.

Renaud was a career soldier and, aside from a dueling incident, was consistently praised for his military and administrative work. His most important military work was among the Miami Indians where he was responsible for assisting with the work of Jean-Baptiste Bissot de Vinsenne in keeping the Miami from joining forces with the English. After Bissot's death in 1719, he established a number of garrison posts, one of which was commanded by François-Marie Bissot de Vinsenne.

Dubuisson was he post commander at Detroit in 1712. He commanded a post at the Miamis near Toledo from 1723 to 1727. By 1729, he was appointed post commander at Michilimackinac.

References 

 

1666 births
1739 deaths
People of New France
French emigrants to Canada